John Percival (1779–1862) was a United States Navy officer.

John Percival may also refer to:

John Percival (Mayor of London), lord mayor of London in 1498
John Percival (bishop) (1834–1918), English educator and bishop
John Percival (botanist) (1863–1949), English agricultural botanist who described Khorasan wheat
John Percival (politician) (1870–1942), Australian politician
John Percival (rugby league) (20th century), New Zealand rugby league referee
John Percival (TV producer) (1937–2005), British television producer and documentary maker
John Percival (cricketer) (1902–1983), English cricketer

See also
Jack Percival (footballer, born 1913) (1913–1979), English footballer (Manchester City)
Jack Percival (footballer, born 1924), English footballer (Huddersfield Town)
John Perceval (disambiguation)